= Antonio París Sanz de Santamaría =

Bogotano leader

Antonio París Sanz de Santamaría (1818–1853) was a Bogotano leader.
